E. portoricensis may refer to:

 Eburia portoricensis, a longhorn beetle
 Elaver portoricensis, a sac spider
 Eleutherodactylus portoricensis, a frog native to Puerto Rico
 Emathis portoricensis, a jumping spider
 Emerita portoricensis, a sand crab
 Erioptera portoricensis, a crane fly
 Eurema portoricensis, a butterfly found in Puerto Rico